41 G. Arae (abbreviated to 41 G. Ara), also known as GJ 666, is a trinary star system in the constellation Ara  from the Sun. Although often called just 41 Arae, it is more accurate to call it 41 G. Arae, as the number 41 is the Gould designation (Flamsteed only covered the northern hemisphere).

The primary star in this system is a G-type main sequence star with a stellar classification of G8V. It has about 81% of the mass of the Sun, and 79% of the Sun's radius. The fainter member of the pair, a red dwarf, has a peculiar spectrum that shows a deficiency in elements with a higher atomic number than Helium. No planetary companions have been detected in orbit around these stars.

The two stars share a highly elliptical orbit that takes several centuries to complete. The estimates of the period range from 693 to 2,200 years, and the average separation of the two stars is about 210 AU (or 210 times the average distance between the Earth and the Sun).

41 G. Arae is most likely a triple, comprising the following components: Gliese 666A supposed as a spectroscopic binary, and Gliese 666B as its companion. Two other visual companions were proposed, but neither share the system's motion. Observations from Gaia have shown that it is in fact component B which is binary, with an orbital period of 88 days.

This system has a relatively high proper motion, moving over a second of arc across the sky each year. The space velocity components of this system are  = . The stars in this system show low chromospheric activity, and have a net space velocity of 52 km/s relative to the Sun. This, in combination with their low metallicity, shows that the pair belongs to the old disk population.

See also
 List of star systems within 25–30 light-years

References

External links
 41 G. Arae 2 SolStation entry.
 HR 6416
 Image 41 G Arae
 HIC 84720
 CCDM 17191-4638

Ara (constellation)
Triple star systems
G-type main-sequence stars
M-type main-sequence stars
Arae, 41
Arae, 41
0666
156274
084720
6416
CD-46 11370
217157387